Dan Topolinschi (born 20 February 1966) is a Romanian former footballer who played as a left defender.

Conviction
After he retired from playing football, Topolinschi settled in Călărași and worked as a police officer. In 2000 he was arrested for taking a bribe and was sentenced to two years in prison. Topolinschi claims he was wrongfully convicted.

Honours
Dinamo București
Cupa României: 1985–86

References

1966 births
Living people
Romanian footballers
Romania under-21 international footballers
Association football defenders
Liga I players
Liga II players
Süper Lig players
FC Dinamo București players
FC Politehnica Iași (1945) players
Faur București players
FC Progresul București players
FC Sportul Studențesc București players
FC Dunărea Călărași players
Bakırköyspor footballers
Romanian expatriate footballers
Expatriate footballers in Turkey
Expatriate sportspeople in Turkey
Romanian expatriate sportspeople in Turkey
Sportspeople from Iași